Lewis Ernest Sawyer (June 24, 1867 – May 5, 1923) was a U.S. Representative from Arkansas.

Born in Shelby County, Alabama, Sawyer moved with his parents to Lee County, Mississippi.
He attended the public schools and was graduated from the University of Mississippi at Oxford.
He studied law.
He was admitted to the bar and commenced practice at Friars Point, Mississippi, in 1895.
He served as mayor of Friars Point from 1896 until he enlisted in the Spanish–American War in June 1898.
He served in the Philippine Islands during the war.
He resumed the practice of law in Iuka, Mississippi, in 1900.
He moved to Hot Springs, Arkansas, in 1908 and continued the practice of his profession.
He served as member of the State house of representatives in 1913 and 1915 and was its speaker in the latter year.

Sawyer was elected as a Democrat to the Sixty-eighth Congress and served from March 4, 1923, until his death at Hot Springs, Arkansas, May 5, 1923.
He was interred in Hollywood Cemetery.

See also
List of United States Congress members who died in office (1900–49)

References

1867 births
1923 deaths
Mayors of places in Mississippi
United States Army officers
Democratic Party members of the United States House of Representatives from Arkansas
Speakers of the Arkansas House of Representatives
Democratic Party members of the Arkansas House of Representatives
People from Shelby County, Alabama
People from Lee County, Mississippi
People from Friars Point, Mississippi
People from Iuka, Mississippi